The Courthouse of Arezzo is a judiciary building in Arezzo, Italy, designed by the Italian architect Manfredi Nicoletti. It consists of two bodies: the first one is the building of the former Sanatorium “Antonio Garbasso” restored, and houses most of the court offices. The second building was constructed in 2004-2008, and  houses the garage, the archives, a large multi-level hall, two large double story courtrooms, a number of offices and the press room, in addition to bathrooms and accessories. It has the shape of a solid with a complex geometry.

The plan layout is based on an ellipse, a section of cone with inclined vertex. The coved granite wall follows the curvature of the cone’s surface, but its external facing is implemented through flat slabs having the same size. The opposite southern wall is made up of two undulating surfaces, but since these complex curves are derived from lined systems, they are implemented via simple elements: rectilinear steel pillars placed each under a different angle, which support steel modular and rectilinear connecting elements.

The project of the New Building is marked by two fundamental bioclimatic principles: passive cooling and heating. The design choice is therefore oriented towards a façade more protected on the northern side, and more open on the southern side allowing a better climate control and thus a reduction of energy costs.

External links
 The Courthouse on www.manfredinicoletti.com
 Arezzo Courthouse in architecturenewsplus.com

Buildings and structures in Arezzo
Government buildings completed in 2008